The Midnight Adventure is a 1928 American silent mystery film directed by Duke Worne and starring Cullen Landis, Edna Murphy and Ernest Hilliard.

Synopsis
Guests a country mansion all fall under suspicion when a murder is committed.

Cast
 Cullen Landis as Fred Nicholson 
 Edna Murphy as Jeanne Wentworth 
 Ernest Hilliard as Randolph Sargent 
 Jack Richardson as Anthony Munroe 
 Allan Sears as Bart Gainsborough 
 Virginia Kirtley as Alicia Gainsborough 
 Maude Truax as Patricia Royles 
 Ben Hall as Bertram Wellington Coy 
 Betty Caldwell as Josephine Franklin 
 Tom O'Grady as Mr. Caldwell 
 Fred Kelsey as Cassidy 
 Edward Cecil as Wilkins 
 Amber Norman as Mrs. Caldwell

References

Bibliography
 John T. Weaver. Twenty Years of Silents, 1908-1928. Scarecrow Press, 1971.

External links

1928 films
1928 mystery films
American mystery films
Films directed by Duke Worne
American silent feature films
1920s English-language films
American black-and-white films
Rayart Pictures films
1920s American films
Silent mystery films